Piedras del Tunjo (Spanish for "Tunjo Rocks") is an important archaeological park established on a natural rock shelter  west of Bogotá in the municipality of Facatativá.

Description 

In the Late Pleistocene, the site used to be the shore of a large lake flooding the Bogotá savanna; Lake Humboldt .8 It was used by the Muisca rulers as a refuge during the time of the Spanish conquest. The site is one of the possible places where the soldiers of Gonzalo Jiménez de Quesada killed the ruling zipa Tisquesusa in April 1537.

The rocks are covered with pictographs made by Muisca artists on rocks of the Guadalupe Group. Their age has not been confirmed. The area of the park used to be an hacienda, property of a wealthy family since colonial times. It was nationalized in 1946 to establish the park.

Destruction of the ancient pictographs 
Decades of government negligence and lack of policies for the protection of archaeological heritage have resulted in the destruction of most of the ancient paintings.

Gallery

See also 

Aguazuque, Checua, Tequendama, Tibitó, Sun Temple
El Abra, Cojines del Zaque

References

Bibliography

External links 

  Restoration and training on pictographs - a Colombian Case (Archaeological park of Facatativá) - Rupestreweb
  To the rescue of the archaeological park of Facatativá - Rupestreweb

Further reading 
 
 
 
 

Rock art in South America
History of Colombia
Archaeological sites in Colombia
Pre-Columbian archaeological sites
Parks in Colombia
Tourism in Colombia
Archaeological parks
Geography of Cundinamarca Department
Tourist attractions in Cundinamarca Department
Tourist attractions near Bogotá
Muisca and pre-Muisca sites
Petroglyphs in South America